Alejandro Gomez may refer to:
Alejandro Gómez (politician) (1908–2005), former Vice President of Argentina
Alejandro Gómez (runner) (born 1967), Spanish long-distance runner
Alejandro Gómez (swimmer) (born 1985), Venezuelan swimmer who competed at the 2007 and 2011 Pan American Games
Alejandro Gómez (tennis) (born 1991), Colombian tennis player
Alejandro Gómez Monteverde (born 1977), Mexican film director
Alejandro Gómez (Bolivian footballer) (born 1979), Bolivian football midfielder
Papu Gómez (Alejandro Darío Gómez, born 1988), Argentine association forward

See also
Jesús Alejandro Gómez (Mexican footballer), Mexican footballer